This list of aircraft at the Royal Air Force Museum London summarises the collection of aircraft and engines that is housed at the Royal Air Force Museum London.

Hangars

Hangar 1

Main point of entry to the museum with shop, café and corporate areas. The café provides seating under the wings of the Sunderland flying boat.

Hangar 2 (The Grahame-White Factory)

Hangar 3 and 4 (Historic Hangars)

Hangar 5 (The Bomber Hall)

Hangar 6 (Age of Uncertainty)

Previously on display

Engines on display

See also
 Royal Air Force Museum Cosford
List of aircraft at the Royal Air Force Museum Cosford

References

Aerospace museums in England
Royal Air Force Museum Cosford
Museum